Bloodthirst is the seventh studio album by American death metal band Cannibal Corpse. It was released on October 19, 1999 through Metal Blade Records.

Track listing

Credits 
Writing, performance and production credits are adapted from the album liner notes.

Personnel 
Cannibal Corpse
 George "Corpsegrinder" Fisher – vocals
 Pat O'Brien – lead guitar
 Jack Owen – rhythm guitar
 Alex Webster – bass
 Paul Mazurkiewicz – drums

Production
 Colin Richardson – production
 Justin Leeah – engineering
 Bobby Torres – studio assistant
 Eddy Schreyer – mastering

Artwork and design
 Vincent Locke – artwork
 Brian J. Ames – graphic design
 Alex McKnight – photography

Studios 
 Village Productions, Tornillo, TX, US – production
 Oasis Mastering – mastering

References

External links
 
 Bloodthirst at Metal Blade Records

1999 albums
Cannibal Corpse albums
Metal Blade Records albums